Tamara Arelis Angulo Cuero (born 11 February 1998) is an Ecuadorian footballer who plays as a centre back for Argentine club River Plate and the Ecuador women's national team.

References

1998 births
Living people
Women's association football central defenders
Ecuadorian women's footballers
Sportspeople from Guayaquil
Ecuador women's international footballers
C.S.D. Independiente del Valle footballers
21st-century Ecuadorian women